Auringon talo is a 1990 Finnish-language chamber opera by Einojuhani Rautavaara.

Recording
The House of the Sun (sung in Finnish) Anna-Kristiina Kaappola, Raija Regnell, Mia Huhta, Helena Juntunen, Ulla Raiskio, Jukka Romu, Tuomas Katajala, Tommi Hakala, Markus Nieminen, Petri Bäckström Oulu Symphony Orchestra, Mikko Franck 2CD Ondine

References

Operas
1990 operas
Finnish-language operas
Operas by Einojuhani Rautavaara